Elmis is a genus of beetles belonging to the family Elmidae.

The species of this genus are found in Europe and Northern America.

Species:
 Elmis aenea (Müller, 1806) 
 Elmis atlantis (Alluaud, 1922)

References

Elmidae